Nome Airport  is a state-owned public-use airport located two nautical miles (4 km) west of the central business district of Nome, a city in the Nome Census Area of the U.S. state of Alaska.

As per Federal Aviation Administration records, the airport had 61,651 passenger boardings (enplanements) in calendar year 2017, and 64,122 enplanements in 2018 It is included in the National Plan of Integrated Airport Systems for 2011–2015, which categorized it as a primary commercial service airport (more than 10,000 enplanements per year).

The State of Alaska also operates Nome City Field , a public general aviation airfield located one nautical mile (1.85 km) north of the city.

History
In World War II, the civilian Nome Airport shared use of the runway with Marks Army Airfield for transfer of Lend-Lease aircraft to the Soviet Union and in 1942, for air defense of the western coast of Alaska. Renamed Marks Air Force Base in 1948, the military installation was used as a fighter-interceptor forward base until they were pulled back to Galena Air Force Station. Marks AFB closed in 1950 and an air base squadron was at Nome Airport until December 1956.

Facilities and aircraft
Nome Airport resides at elevation of 38 feet (11 m) above mean sea level. It has two runways with asphalt surfaces: Runway 10/28 is 6,000 by 150 feet (1,829 x 46 m) and Runway 3/21 is 6,175 by 150 feet (1,882 x 46 m).

For the 12-month period ending January 1, 2010, the airport had 28,000 aircraft operations, an average of 76 per day: 54% air taxi, 36% general aviation, 5% scheduled commercial, and 5% military. At that time there were 71 aircraft based at this airport: 72% single-engine, 17% multi-engine, 7% helicopter, and 4% military.

Free parking is available at the airport.

Airlines and destinations

Passenger

Statistics

In popular culture
In Call of Duty: Modern Warfare 2, Nome Airport (referred to as "Sand Bravo" in the game) is featured as one of the targets of Russia during its invasion of the United States by "70 bogies".

References

External links

 Topographic map from USGS The National Map
 
 

Airports in the Nome Census Area, Alaska
Nome, Alaska